Moses Hoagland (June 19, 1812 – April 16, 1865) was a U.S. Representative from Ohio.

Born near Baltimore, Maryland, Hoagland attended the local public schools. He studied law and was admitted to the bar in 1842, commencing practice in Millersburg, Ohio. He served in the Ohio infantry during the Mexican War and was promoted to the rank of major for bravery in action.

Hoagland was elected as a Democrat to the Thirty-first Congress (March 4, 1849 – March 3, 1851). He was an unsuccessful candidate for reelection in 1850 to the Thirty-second Congress and returned home to resume the practice of law. He was appointed associate justice for the Territory of Washington on June 21, 1853, but declined to accept the position.

He died in Millersburg and was interred in Oak Hill Cemetery.

Sources

 

1812 births
1865 deaths
People from Baltimore County, Maryland
People from Millersburg, Ohio
Ohio lawyers
American military personnel of the Mexican–American War
United States Army officers
Democratic Party members of the United States House of Representatives from Ohio
19th-century American politicians
19th-century American lawyers